YPlan was a mobile-first event discovery and booking service, which was co-founded by Viktoras Jucikas and Rytis Vitkauskas in London, United Kingdom in 2012. Users are presented with a curated list of things to do, including last-minute events, which can be booked direct on the app or via the website.

In 2015, The Next Web named YPlan the UK's Fasted Growing Tech Company. In 2013, the London Evening Standard reported that Stephen Fry was a fan of the app. On the 21 October 2016, YPlan was acquired by Time Out Group for 1.6 million GBP.

In August 2017 the YPlan app for London was discontinued without prior notice.

Background
Viktoras Jucikas and Rytis Vitkauskas co-founded YPlan in 2012. Vitkauskas is co-founder and CEO. Previously he was Vice President at Summit Partners and responsible for software and technology investments from 2008 until 2011. He started his first business aged 14, a computer assembly, repair and network maintenance company in Lithuania. He went on to Jacobs University Bremen, Germany, where he met fellow co-founder Viktoras on a basketball court in 2003. Rytis went on to receive his MBA with distinction from Harvard Business School.

Jucikas (CTO) was previously an Executive Director with Goldman Sachs. He graduated from Jacobs University, Bremen with an MSc in Computational Sciences and Kaunas University of Technology with a BSc in Computer Science. He has won Seedhack FinTech’12, was quarter-finalist of Google Code Jam’04 and semi-finalist of ACM ICPC’02.

YPlan provides London and its other cities with a curated list of events. In the first months of the app’s launch, it presented events on the same day, the next day and the coming weekend. As the company grew, so did the selection of events. Now there are hundreds of things to do that can be booked, from a few hours’ time away, to months in advance. It is the element of curation, highlighting different events for each user, that makes YPlan different from comparable event apps.

The example used in the New York Times stated that the events often vary in culture and geographical distance across the city, with events located in Paddington in West London, to Shoreditch in East London. This limited choice was integral to how the events are showcased. YPlan has full coverage and a large range, but highlights the very best up front. Jucikas stated, from research carried out by the company and others, that  "the absence of too much choice makes the consumer buy more rather than less. If you have 100 events you would be less likely to go to one because you would be overwhelmed by choice."

Events are selected by hand and advanced personalisation algorithms. Things like Facebook likes and the users location, browsing behaviour, tag selection and the browsing behaviour of their friends affect which events are highlighted. At the time of Jucikas' interview with the New York Times, he stated the company had no real competitors as larger ticketing companies, such as Ticketmaster, would not have interest in such a small niche.

The market size according to various researchers would be hard to measure, but Jucikas stated that only 2% of London events were ever sold out, meaning they potentially had a large market to work in. According to the London Standard, there are around £600 million-worth of unsold theatre seats each year.

In April 2013, Business Insider listed YPlan on their list of London startups to watch. Around the same time, YPlan appeared in 1st place on a similar list published by Mashable.

The New York YPlan launch party took place on September 19, 2013 in New York City. Pharrell Williams performed and guests included David Schwimmer, Stephen Dorff, Kelly Rutherford, Emily Ratajkowski and Adrienne Bailon.

A year after launch, it was stated that the company had reached over 500,000 users. By the end of 2014, the app had more than 1 million downloads.

Mechanics
Users of YPlan can login each day and are given a selection of plays, concerts, pop-up restaurants and other events. Events can then be purchased through the app or on the website, with users also given the opportunity to share their purchase via social media.

During a New York Times interview, it was stated that when the app moved into a new city, the company must focus on signing venues and partners, in order to ensure that users come back to the app after initial registration.

Initially, the YPlan app was only available on Apple's iOS, but was later released on Android and Kindle.

Funding
Early investors in the app included Wellington Partners, Octopus Ventures, Brent Hoberman, the founder of lastminute.com and Peter Reid, the founder of Songkick.

The company's first major investment in a Series A funding deal came in 2013 and was worth $12 million. The round was led by General Catalyst Partners, the venture capital group behind Airbnb. Other key backers include Ashton Kutcher's A-Grade Investments and Baltcap. The funding was part of a major expansion to provide the app in New York City. It was at this stage that Sean Moriarty, former CEO of Ticketmaster, joined the Board of Directors.

In 2014, the app received funding of $24 million (£16 million), according to TechCrunch. This brought the total funding of YPlan to just under $38 million. It was stated that the financing deal will allow the company to expand into other cities.

On the 21 October 2016, YPlan was acquired by Time Out Group for 1.6 million GBP.
AS of 2015, the company had accumulated losses of $20.8M, and accounts showed how Rytis Vitkauskas talks of building a billion dollar company were far off the mark.

Recognition
 Tech5 UK's Fastest Growing Tech Startup (2015)
 The Sunday Times Tech Track 100: Ones to Watch (2014)
 WIRED: Europe's 100 Hottest Start-ups 2014 (2014)
 Forbes: Hottest Global Start-up of 2013 (2013)
 Evening Standard: Power List Tech Stars Rytis Vitkauskas (2013)
 Evening Standard: Silicon 60 Rytis Vitkauskas (2013
 The Hospital Club 100 list (2013)
 Startups Awards: Business of the Year (2013)
 Startups Awards: Mobile Business of the Year (2013)
 Tech City News: Elevator Pitch Awards: Fastest Growing Startup (2013)
 Appsters Awards: Best Entertainment App (2013)

References

Online companies of the United Kingdom
British companies established in 2012
2016 mergers and acquisitions
Privately held companies based in London